F.I.R. is a Taiwanese pop rock band formed in 2004. The band consists of Lydia (lead vocals), Ian Chen (keyboards), and Real Huang (guitar, vocals). Producer Ian Chen formed his own band then recruited the other two members to form F.I.R. They are well known throughout Asia after their hit "Lydia", which gained popularity was the theme song for the Taiwanese TV drama The Outsiders (鬥魚). The drama was aired in Taiwan without revealing the singer of the theme song. The song attracted many fans, which led to F.I.R.'s big success when they finally debuted in 2004.

In 2018, it was announced that Faye would not be part of F.I.R. anymore as she was removed from the official Facebook page of F.I.R. without notification. In October 2018, it was announced that a new lead singer, Lydia was selected among hundreds of new singers by Ian and O Real.

The name F.I.R. comes from the initials of the names of the three members: Faye, Ian, also O Real. It is also a backronym for "Fairyland In Reality", their debut album name.

Members

Current members 
Producer/Keyboard
Stage name: Ian (I)
Birth name: Chén Jiànníng (陳建寧)
Birthplace: Taiwan
Birth date: 
Musical Instrument: Guitar, Keyboard, Keytar
Guitarist
Stage name: Real (R) (阿沁, Ā Qìn)
Birth name: Huáng Hànqīng (黃漢青)
Birthplace: Taiwan
Birth date: 
Musical Instruments: Guitar, keyboard, piano, arranging music on the computer
Band Position: Electric guitar, some keyboard, some arranging on the music and sound
Lead Vocal
Stage name: Lydia
Birth name: Hán ruì (韩睿)
Birthplace: Shanxi
Birth date:

Past Member 
Lead Vocal
Stage name: Faye (F) (飛 or 飛兒, Fei or Feier) 
Birth name: Chan Wéntíng (詹雯婷)
Birthplace: Taiwan
Birth date:

Discography

Singles
 Spread Love(把愛傳出來)  (December 2005)
City of Sound(声音之城) (December 2018)
愛我所愛 (December 2018)
Forever Young (September 2019)

Studio albums

Extended plays
 I Want to Fly - Path to Dream All Record CD+2VCD
(我要飛 - 尋夢之途全紀錄) (17 September 2004)
 I Wanna Fly 我要飛
 Demo: Lydia
 Demo: Our Love 我們的愛
 Demo: Your Smile 你的微笑
 Demo: Tarot Cards 塔羅牌
 Glory Days- Anniversary CD+DVD
(光榮之役-出道週年影音全集) (30 June 2005)
 Fly Away (unplug version)
 Thousand Years of Love 千年之戀 (unplug version)
 LOVE*3 (unplug version)
 The Reason of Giving Up 死心的理由 (string version)

Soundtracks
 The Outsiders 鬥魚 (10 February 2004)
心之火 (with 彭佳慧Julia Pang)(2 June 2015)

Awards and nominations

References

External links

  F.I.R. @ Warner Music Taiwan

Musical groups established in 2004
Mandopop musical groups
Taiwanese rock music groups
Taiwanese co-ed groups
Taiwanese Hokkien-language bands